Dolgy is a rural locality (a khutor) in Pokrovskoye Rural Settlement, Leninsky District, Volgograd Oblast, Russia. The population was 24 as of 2010. There are 2 streets.

Geography 
The village is located on Caspian Depression, on the left bank of the Kalinov, 76 km from Volgograd, 27 km from Leninsk, 16 km from Pokrovka.

References 

Rural localities in Leninsky District, Volgograd Oblast